Jaime Azcárraga (born 9 September 1959) is a Mexican equestrian. He competed at the 1984, 1988, 1992 and the 2012 Summer Olympics.

References

1959 births
Living people
Mexican male equestrians
Olympic equestrians of Mexico
Equestrians at the 1984 Summer Olympics
Equestrians at the 1988 Summer Olympics
Equestrians at the 1992 Summer Olympics
Equestrians at the 2012 Summer Olympics
Pan American Games medalists in equestrian
Pan American Games bronze medalists for Mexico
Equestrians at the 1983 Pan American Games
Sportspeople from Mexico City
Medalists at the 1983 Pan American Games